Richard Osborne (born 16 June 1964) is a retired Australian rules footballer who enjoyed a lengthy career in the VFL/AFL. He played a total of 283 games in 17 seasons, and played with four clubs, as well as representing Victoria 7 times in interstate competition.

Originally from Bulleen/Templestowe, he arrived at Fitzroy and made his senior debut in 1982 as a 17-year-old. Beginning in the forward line as an understudy to Bernie Quinlan, he would go on to become Fitzroy's leading goalkicker five times, including four consecutive seasons between 1986 and 1989, with feats of 60 goals on each occasion. He was made captain in 1991 for one season.

At the end of the 1992 season, after 187 games and 411 goals with the Lions, Osborne indicated to Fitzroy that he wanted to leave, with a move to Essendon the most likely result. Fitzroy delisted him, however, and in the pre-season draft he went on to become the No.1 pick, and began a short-lived 16-game career at Sydney. He suffered a severe head injury, being taken off the ground in an ambulance, but surprisingly returned to the field just three weeks later. In Round 13, Osborne kicked ten goals in the club's only win for the entire year, against . After just one season at the Swans, he moved to Footscray in 1994.

In March 1994, during the pre-season, the Western Bulldogs released Osborne to let him participate in an NFL trial in the United States; however, Osborne's trial was unsuccessful and he returned to Australia.

He played 51 games there, including winning the club leading goalkicker award in 1995.

At the end of 1996, Osborne changed clubs yet again, this time to Collingwood, where he stayed from 1997 until 1998. He managed 29 games in the two seasons at his final club, playing in a different role, half-back, where for most of his career he had predominantly been a forward.

In 1999, he was a boundary rider for the Seven Network during the finals series, and continued that role until Seven lost the rights to AFL coverage in 2001. In 1998, Osborne released his autobiography, Ossie Rules, co-written with Michael Hyde.

On 6 November 2009, it was announced he would coach the Monash Gryphons in Division 4 of the Victorian Amateur Football Association (VAFA) in 2010. He coached the side to a near-perfect 15–1 season and the club's first ever premiership and promotion to Division 3.

References

External links

1964 births
Australian rules footballers from Victoria (Australia)
Collingwood Football Club players
Fitzroy Football Club players
Living people
Sydney Swans players
Western Bulldogs players
Victorian State of Origin players
Australian rules football coaches
Australia international rules football team players